The 13th Pan American Games were held in Havana, Cuba from August 2 to August 18, 1991.

Medals

Gold

Men's Individual Race (Road): Robinson Merchan

Silver

Men's Flyweight (– 51 kg): David Serradas
Men's Light Heavyweight (– 81 kg): Raimundo Yant

Men's Masters: Luis Serfaty
Men's Teams: Pedro Carreyo, Pedro Elias Cardozo, Luis Serfaty, and Francisco Carabano
Women's Teams: Mirella Trasolini, Gisela Sánchez, Mariela Alarza, and Gabriela Bigai

Men's Flyweight (– 52 kg): Humberto Fuentes
Men's Bantamweight (– 56 kg): José Farfán
Men's Light-Heavyweight (– 82.5 kg): Julio César Luña

Men's Greco-Roman (– 82 kg): Luis Rondón

Bronze
Shooting

 Free Pistol(Ven): Edgar Espinoza - Alejandro Muñoz - Bernardo Ocando

Men's Bantamweight (– 54 kg): Luis Ojeda
Men's Welterweight (– 67 kg): José Guzman

Men's Lightweight (– 67.5 kg): José Medina
Men's Middleweight (– 75 kg): Jorge Kassar

Men's Freestyle (– 68 kg): José Díaz 
Men's Greco-Roman (– 62 kg): Winston Santos 
Men's Greco-Roman (– 74 kg): Néstor García

Results by event

Basketball

Men's Team Competition
Preliminary Round (Group A)
Lost to United States (66-91)
Defeated Cuba (84-70)
Defeated Bahamas (96-81)
Lost to Argentina (85-100)
Quarterfinals
Lost to Puerto Rico (104-111)
Classification Matches
5th/8th place: Defeated Uruguay (85-79)
5th/6th place: Lost to Brazil (88-90) → 6th place  → 10th place
Team Roster

See also
 Venezuela at the 1992 Summer Olympics

Notes

Nations at the 1991 Pan American Games
P
1991